Pie in the Sky is a 2.5D and 3D  first-person shooter engine most popular in the mid-to-late 1990s by Pie in the Sky Software, also known as Power 3D and the 3D Game Creation or 3D Game Creation System engine. The engine was used in two games by the company as well as many other independent games and amateur projects after it was turned into a commercial game creator, largely because it minimized the amount of computer programming knowledge needed to make 3D games in its editing tools, making it suitable even for beginners with no game-design experience.

History
The company, formed  principally by programmer Kevin Stokes, first dabbled in 3D computer graphics by creating a modestly popular terminate-and-stay-resident 3D screen saver called InnerMission in 1987. When the market for 3D applications started to grow more popular, they developed a 3D flight simulator called Corncob 3D in 1992. The game was inspired by a similar flight simulator for the Apple II, but implemented a more advanced physics model and the possibility to jump off the plane and explore the environment on foot. Corncob 3D was first released as shareware and then later commercially as Corncob Deluxe by MVP Software. In late 1992, after seeing Wolfenstein 3D and having gained experience with Corncob 3D, Stokes decided to write a brand new 3D engine in C and then used it for the first-person shooter Lethal Tender in 1993. Based on that, they were hired by a German group to create a German-language first-person shooter.

Pie in the Sky released Terminal Terror, the sequel to Lethal Tender, in 1994. The development of this game, to be published by Expert Software, had taken precedence over the German development and thus strained the relationship. The game was relatively successful, but the company sensed they were unable to keep up and stay ahead of other first-person shooter developers. In the summer of 1994 during the Shareware Industry Conference in Indianapolis, Indiana, Kevin Stokes met a young indie developer named John Nagle, and they discussed the possibility of using Kevin's engine to create a game development system for non-programmers. Shortly thereafter, work began on the project, with John working on the game editor remotely from his home in West Virginia, and dropping builds via dial-up BBS to Kevin's home in New York. The partnership was equal between Stokes and Nagle, with a small percentage to David Johndrow, who licensed use of his MVP Paint product to be included in the package. They launched the 3D Game Creation System during Christmas of 1994, marketing themselves to non-technical consumers who wanted to make their own 3D games. It is first used by games such as Red Babe by The DaRK CaVErN Productions and La Cosa Nostra by Slade 3D Software.

In 1995 it was used in the Despair series, Terror in Christmas Town, Deer Napped, and Castaway: The Ordeal Begins as well as the official example games Meltdown and Industrial Killers. Meanwhile, the various bugs in the program were worked out and upgrades and patches were released, partly because of the rushed development of the system in the first place. The contract with the German group changed, and instead the new game creation system was re-released in German as well as English.

The engine was ported to Microsoft Windows and Direct X in 1998, as well as updating it beyond Wolfenstein 3D-like standards. The company had first detected the decline of DOS in 1994, and had decided to port to Windows and adopt 3D API technology using the Renderware library. This was first attempted in a racing game called Baja Bash, but emphasis was switched to converting the old game creation engine because of market demands, time constraints, and some criticism of the later game - despite its attempted physics advances. Because of licensing restrictions however, they eventually opted to use Direct3D.

In this updated form that it was used in the game Pencil Whipped, designed for the 2000 Independent Games Festival. Chub Gam 3D, an earlier freeware game, was reissued in director's cut form in 1998. In 2001 the third version of the engine was released, featuring true-3D polygonal enemies and weapons, 3D terrain, super lighting effects, and other improvements.

The engine ceased being sold in May 2003 and soon after the Pie in the Sky company website came down. The book 3D Game Creation by Luke Ahearn for Cyberrookies has a section which examines making games using the Pie in the Sky development tools, and the system, alongside GameMaker: Studio, Construct, The Games Factory and FPS Creator, was used in the "Problem Solving through Game Creation" course put out by the College of Engineering and Applied Science.

In 2010 the company was restarted, and has created a physics engine demo and a dice simulation for the Android operating system, tested on the Motorola Droid. The choice of a physics engine is likely inspired by the popularity of the Corncob 3D physics. The company's new website notes "the focus will be more about making fun stuff that being a money-producing business." The rebirth of the company came from a feeling that small companies can make a better headway in the mobile market than on the PC market, based on their struggling experience trying to keep the Pie in the Sky tools current to big-name standards in the 1990s.

Games

Internal Usage
Pie in the Sky Software made several games on the engine and its predecessors, first its own shareware products and later examples for the Game Creation System,

Corncob 3D
The Pie in the Sky engine's popular predecessor game. Instead of being a first-person shooter like the later games based on Pie in the Sky, it is a flight simulator game. The game takes place in a world where Hitler died in childhood and World War II never happened. In its stead, aliens have invaded the Earth. The player must take control of a F4U Corsair, the only World War II plane that made it into this alternate history, and defeat the alien invaders. The game takes place in a variety of different locations and was noted for its original gameplay and presentation. It is also known for being one of the few shareware flight simulators. The game was later released as freeware along with the source code.

Computer Gaming Worlds reviewer, a United States Army Aviation Branch pilot, stated that "Corncob 3D delivers one of the best attempts at a VR-like  'living environment' in a flight sim so far". He praised the "total, virtual, freedom" in the game world, the smooth animation, compatibility with lower-end computers, and "believable" flight models, while criticizing the lack of terrain features, air-to-air combat, and limited control options. The reviewer concluded that Corncob 3D "offers some new ideas that will certainly be seen in future games", with a high "price/challenge/fun" ratio.

Lethal Tender
The first game to use the actual Pie In The Sky 3D engine, released in 1993. Secret agent Nick Hunter must thwart the evil Thorne Devereaux, who is planting bombs in U.S. currency. The game sported various singular features such as the possibility to take the uniforms of dead enemies for protection. It was more advanced than most of its peers, allowing for non-perpendicular walls (like in Doom), jumping, and a rudimental simulation of different types of injuries based on the part of the body being hit. The game is described by Home of the Underdogs as "a fun, albeit amateurish, first-person shooter." The game set out the style followed closely by most other Pie in the Sky engine games, particularly noting its inventory system, though even its graphics were mostly reused by later games as well. The game, also known as Legal Tender, was published by Expert Software and later re-released by Froggman.

Terminal Terror
Pie in the Sky Software's sequel to Lethal Tender, released in 1994. The game featured an expanded array of features including early examples of the stealth gameplay of later games like Thief: The Dark Project, objective-based missions, and improved texture mapping. The player is again Nick Hunter, with a mission to take back into custody the international terrorist Bruno Riggs, who has fortified himself and his men in a captured airport terminal, together with several hostages, including Hunter's fiance. Abandonia compared it to System Shock in that it was way ahead of its time, referencing its new features such as friendly non-playable characters and damage varying based on where hit. The game was published by Expert Software.

Industrial Killers
An example game made in 1995 to demonstrate the original DOS version. It takes the form of a short game featuring giant killer bugs. In particular it shows off the engine's outdoors capability within its large first level. Included were various notes and promotionals for the Game Creation System.

Meltdown
Another short demonstration for the engine made in March 1995 by Terry F. Hamel, an additional level designer for Blood by Monolith Productions and a Doom custom mapper. The player had to escape from a military compound by bypassing an energy barrier to pick up an elevator key. A separate game by this title was also created by Robert Cureton using the GCS.

Santa's Rescue 3D
A Christmas-themed example featuring an alternative sprite set to match the theme, as well as non-violent play. This formed the basis of both Deer Napped and Terror in Christmas Town.

Max Resistance
Max Resistance was an example game from the company website that was released in 2001 to promote the final version of the Game Creation System, to showcase both its gameplay and graphical abilities - particularly 3D terrain and models. It was also made quickly and cheaply, to show the relative quality that could be easily attained with the tool. The story involves a man named Max taking up arms against an alien invasion.

Cyberpuck
Although not created by Pie in the Sky Software, the early release date of this title and its extensive modification from the base engine indicate that this game was produced through license from Pie and not through the GCS. This is most shown by its genre: rather than being a first-person shooter, it is a first-person racing sports game - a remake of the older BallBlaster game for the Apple II. It was developed by Dungeon Entertainment/Webfoot Technologie and published by Homebrew Software/Ticsoft and released in 1992. It is also known as 3D Cyber Puck, 3D Cyber Blaster and 3D Ball Blaster. It is described as a mixture between soccer and hockey, with a wide variety of objects and power-ups available for use, played between two hovercraft in a time when such sports have replaced violence.

DOS Developers
The majority of games were made in the first version of the Game Creation System, which was released for DOS.

Red Babe
Red Babe was one of the first games to use the Pie in the Sky engine that was not made by the engine creators themselves, being made by The DaRK CaVErN Productions. The game features the player's quest to save the beautiful Sharla, the titular "Red Babe" Because of her penchant for a red dress. Future versions were to become a "30+ level intricate 3D game, and an Adult fantasy type with nudity".

La Cosa Nostra
A mobster themed first-person shooter game using the Pie in the Sky engine. The player takes the role of NYPD investigator Slade A. Ryker, who must stop the crime boss Girabaldi and his gang after they murdered his partner/brother-in-law and now hold his wife hostage. It was included on at least one shareware compilation containing the first episode of the game. The second level of the first episode's level track is the theme from the film The Terminator, hinting the soundtrack comprises various MIDI files found on the Internet, though the game's variety in terms of textures, graphics and sounds is more than most Pie in the Sky engine games. The game was developed by Tony L. Ford under the group title of Slade 3D Software.

Despair series
The entire Despair trilogy use the Pie in the Sky engine. All games feature a battle with aliens, with the third game featuring a wind machine threatening Earth. The games were developed by U-Neek Software.

Terror in Christmas Town
A Christmas-themed first-person shooter, featuring the player having to rescue Santa Claus from a polar bear. The game was created by Michael Zerbo and released in 1995. The demo version of the game is still available for free as shareware, though the full version had to be purchased by sending ten dollars directly to Michael Zerbo.

Deer Napped
Like Terror in Christmas Town, this game features a Christmas theme. The player is a ninja working for Santa and must rescue his reindeer from the Abominable Snowpeople. The game was created by Nic-Ty Entertainmentick, which consisted of Nick Fletcher and Tyler Smith of Smiths Falls, Ontario who were both only age 14 at the time of the game's release. The game was made while participating in a program called "I want to be a Millionaire". The aim of the program was to encourage young entrepreneurs to learn about business through hands on experience. The game is notably non-violent as enemies are turned into harmless snowmen rather than dying.

Castaway: The Ordeal Begins
A game by John T. Gallon that features the player landing on a foreign planet, and must proceed to shoot his way through the game. The back story describes the results of the Slrrian War, and how the Terran Stellar Union had failed to defend its lush terraformed planets, and the practice of cloning human prisoners to conquer more Terran worlds unbreathable to them and make up for their low birthrate (probably to accommodate the default human sprites).

Space Station Escape
A release by RBSoft (Roy L. Person Sr.) in 1995,  Space Station Escape is a science fiction game wherein the player has face an alien attack of a space station, one of the last bastions of humanity following Earth's recent destruction. The majority of the enemies in the game are either reprogrammed defence systems or cloned humans made by the aliens to compensate for their low birthrate (probably a concession to the human-like guard sprites that came with the editor). The game centres around releasing the ship's imprisoned crew and either disarm the self-destruct sequence or escape in time. The shareware level contains five levels.

Continuum
Continuum is a plot-focused title with more of an emphasis on free exploration than shooting, released in 1996 through 1997 by Wales & Welch Productions (Jordan Wales and K Conor Welch). The game was created as High School Senior Thesis, in order to develop a "3D adventure" from a tool designed to create an "action killfest" (though it takes advantage of many of the innovative scripting and interactivity features premièred in Terminal Terror), as well as an accompanying paper titled Continuum: An Odyssey of Creation. The game received numerous positive comments, including from Kevin Stokes, and comparisons were drawn to early plot-oriented first-person games such as Strife, as well as numerous statements raising it above the average GCS produced game. The game's heavy plot focus on a secret CIA project at Area 51 into the space-time continuum headed by "Section 7", using recovered alien technology, that now threatens the fabric of the universe itself. Desperate, a prominent and now disillusioned project member, Dr. Richard Golchan, recruits the son of his old friend and collaborator to infiltrate the project in the hopes of exposing and ending it.

Colosso Adventure Series
The Colosso Adventure Series is a trilogy of games by Campana Productions (Thom Campana) made with the engine, with the first part released in April 1996. Based on a childhood dream of creating computer games, the author based his design on his likes and dislikes from mainstream games of the time. The first episode, Escape from Dr. Colosso, was released in December and follows the efforts of man to rescue the kidnapped Red Princess from the vile Dr. Colosso and his legion of henchmen and monsters. Episode two, Colosso Revenge, takes place after the events of the first game and features the quest to deactivate Colosso's create creating machine. Finally, episode three, Colosso Secret, involves the attempt to rid the world of Colosso's mutants back through their time gates. All three episodes were packaged together as the Colosso Value Pack as well, and the series marks an early incarnation of the episodic game model. A successor series was worked on, utilizing a later version of Pie 3D, but only tests and betas were ever released.

PhreAk Software
In 1996, PhreAk Software (comprising Garrie Wilson and Michael Wilford) released two titles using the engine. The Maze! does not have a stated plot; the shareware level featured four levels, and the registered version twenty. Secret Agent : The Escape features the titular agent's attempt to escape a prison complex. The Maze! was included in the compilation 10 Tons of Games: Mega Collection 1.

Chub Gam 3D
Chub Gam 3D is claimed to be one of the earliest freeware first-person shooter games. The game features the adventures of a Harrier jet pilot after his plane crashes and is invited in by the eccentric creatures Chub and Rex. However, rather than settling down for the night as asked, the pilot discovers Rex's shocking secret project. The game is claimed to have won a number of awards, the only traceable one being its inclusion as one of MPI World's "Top 52 Free Games of '98". A director's cut was later released by ChubGamSoft with several improvements, including cutscenes. and it was supposedly sold in Brazil.

Windows Developers
Versions 2.0, released in 1998, and 3.0, released in 2001, were made for Microsoft Windows and featured much more advanced options. John Nagle had moved to Texas to work at Iguana Entertainment as a junior developer and was no longer involved in the project.

Pencil Whipped
Pencil Whipped, released in 2001, might be the most well known of the Pie in the Sky games and one of the only ones to utilize a later version of the engine. The game won developer Lonnie Flickinger (aka Chiselbrain Software) a chance at the $15,000 Seumas McNally Grand Prize and awards for technical excellence, game design, visual art, and audio. Based on a strange dream Flickinger had, the game became known for its unique black and white pencil drawn world and for its wider novelty value, being described by Wired.com as "like being trapped inside a very disturbed child's drawing." In 2006 work was done towards a sequel on using The Game Creators tools, and more recently work has been done on an iPhone remake called "Escape From Big Ass Castle," which was originally released in 2012 for ios6 on the iPhone, but has been taken off of the market to be redone for the io7.

The Tickle People 
A previous game by Chiselbrain Software that served as Lonnie Flickinger's educational project. Released in 2000, the plot involved an accident with a super-computer that led to all the nearby workers being absorbed inside its strange artificial environments. A demo version was released, but the final game was never completed. As with Pencil Whipped, a more modern remake was attempted.

XYLOT's Revenge
XYLOT's Revenge was developed by Somewhere in the Dark USA (sitdusa) featuring an eclectic mixing of modern, fantasy and science fiction themes. The premise is that twenty years after defeating the half-machine Xylot and recovering the medallion of creation, the people of Zyles learn that the villain has returned and recaptured the medallion within his tomb. Kudar, head of the Elders, sends Ephradius, the original challenger of Xylot, to face him once again.

Prezzie Hunt
Prezzie Hunt made by Skyline Software is a FREE multi award-winning Christmas game that is still supported and has a new level added each holiday season, the game is easy to play and unlike most FPS games it doesn't involve weapons or fighting, the player has to explore a winter world made up of large levels inhabited by dancing snowmen, penguins and helpful fairies collecting presents and solving puzzles.

Infiltration
Also made by Skyline Software Infiltration is a classic FPS where the player has to infiltrate the Umbra Corporation to find and steal a mainframe disk and also try to find out what happened to another agent who was sent in before, the game is set over 29 levels but there is only a two level demo available for download, the pages relating to the game have not been updated recently but the author doesn't confirm the game has been shelved, there are plenty of screenshots to suggest there is a lot more of this game than the 2 demo levels.

References

External links 
Pie in the Sky Software website (2010)
Pie in the Sky Wiki
GCS Max
YouTube playlist

1993 software
1995 software
1998 software
2001 software
DOS games
First-person shooters
Flight simulation video games
Video game development software
Video game engines
Video games with 2.5D graphics
Windows games
Sprite-based first-person shooters